Vishy is the nickname of Viswanathan Anand, Indian Chess Grandmaster and World Chess Champion:

Vishy may also refer to:
Gundappa Viswanath, Indian cricketer